Phineas Pett (1 November 1570 – August 1647) was a shipwright and First Resident Commissioner of Chatham Dockyard and a member of the Pett dynasty. Phineas left a memoir of his activities which is preserved in the British Library and was published in 1918.

Family background
Born at "Deptford Strond", he was the second son of Peter Pett of Deptford, his elder brother being named Joseph.

Thomas Fuller, in his Worthies of England states: "I am credibly informed that the mystery of Shipwrights for some descents hath been preserved successfully in families, of whom the Petts about Chatham are of singular regard."

It is likely that Robert Holborn, cited as working with Peter Pett of Deptford at this time was a relative of Richard Hoborn, 'Cousin of Commissioner Pett'.  Peter Pett of Deptford was the son of Peter of Harwich (died 1554). His sister married John Chapman, Master Shipwright, whose own son Richard was born in 1620 and Master Shipwright of Woolwich and Deptford dockyards. the shipwright who was to build the Ark, raised in the Pett household, "as in all probability was Mathew Baker" with whom, from 1570, Peter Pett was associated in the works at Dover.

Phineas's father's first wife, Elizabeth Paynter, had given him a daughter, Lydia, and four sons; their mother died around 1543. Peter Pett of Deptford married his second wife Elizabeth Thornton, the sister of Naval Captain Thornton, and they had eight further children. The three sons were Phineas, Peter and Noah.  Elizabeth died, the widow of Peter, in 1597.

Life
Phineas had been sent to the Free School at Rochester for three years and then moved to a private school in Greenwich, until in 1586 aged 16 he entered Emmanuel College, Cambridge. On his father's death in 1589, Phineas was left destitute. Yet by 1601 Phineas had been appointed assistant to the Master Shipwright at Chatham; over the years his good services, particularly in fitting out the Fleet in six weeks, won support for him at court.

Phineas Pett first met the young Prince Henry in 1604, through the good graces of the Earl of Nottingham, William Howard, the Lord High Admiral. Pett made a miniature ship for the Prince at Chatham. The keel was 28 feet and the breadth 12 feet, and was finished "battlement-wise" like the Ark Royal. On 22 March Pett presented the ship to Prince Henry, who named it the Disdain and "entertained it with great joy, being purposely made to disport himself withal." On 26 April 1604, James I of England gave Phineas, described as a servant of Prince Henry, a grant of a shilling a day. The grant also mentions Phineas's elder brother, Joseph. Phineas and Joseph were named in the royal charter for the incorporation of masters and wardens of the "Art and Mystery of Shipbuilding in England" in April 1605.

In 1607, Pett made and gave a model of a ship intended for Prince Henry to Howard. Howard thought the model good enough for the direct attention of King James and the Prince. He arranged for a presentation in the presence of both at Richmond Palace on 12 November 1607. The model was set up in a private room off the Long Gallery, in an arched frame curtained with crimson taffeta. King James being likewise impressed and "exceedingly delighted with the sight of the model" placed the task of constructing a full-size replica of the ship in Pett's charge.

In 1610, Phineas's wife gave birth to their son, Peter, and in the same year, his (step) Aunt Lydia died. In February 1613 Pett worked with Robert Mansell to organise lavish fireworks and sea-fight or naumachia on the Thames to celebrate wedding of Princess Elizabeth and Frederick V of the Palatinate. Pett himself was captain of a Venetian argosy, which he had converted from an old pinnace called The Spy. Pett wrote that he was in more danger in this "jesting business" than if had been on active sea-service in earnest.

In his diary for 1616, he records that he was 'elected and sworn Master of the Corporation of Shipwrights at our common hall and meeting place at Redriff.' From sometime around 27 March 1616, Pett expected to profit from a commission by Sir Walter Raleigh to build him a vessel of 500 tons for £500. Admiral Howard permitted Pett to lay her keel on the galley dock at Woolwich, with the consent of King James.

In 1631, he was appointed a commissioner of the King for making "a general survey of the whole navy at Chatham."  For this and other works Pett was promoted by Charles to be a principal officer of the Navy, receiving £200 per annum. His patent was sealed on 16 January 1631. In the same year the King, Charles I of England, visited Woolwich to view the launch of the Vanguard, which Pett had built. The king honoured Phineas by participating in a banquet at his lodgings. Pett was later the First Commissioner at Chatham and held this same post from 1631 until his death in 1647.

In June 1634 Phineas made a model ship on wheels for the four-year-old Prince Charles, for use in the long gallery at St James's Palace.

Phineas lived for ten years after the Sovereign of the Seas was launched. In the burial register of the parish of Chatham it is recorded, "Phineas Pett, Esqe. and Capt., was buried 21 August, 1647."

See also
HMS Merhonour (1590)
Ship naming and launching

References

Sources

Further reading
The British Library has among the Harleian Collection his manuscript diary, the 'Life of Mr Phineas Pett', Harley MS 6279, which was used by Thomas Birch, for his Life of Henry Prince of Wales, A. Millar, London, (1760) Note that the Harleian MS is a later copy, with many errors in transcribing. The original MS autobiography is British Library Add MS 9298, which is in Pett's handwriting. This is mentioned in the introduction to the Navy Records Society volume of 1918, editor W.G. Perrin. Some pages are missing from both the original and the Harleian copy; however, the missing pages survived elsewhere when the full version of the original MS was copied by Samuel Pepys for use in the first volume of his 'Naval Miscellany'. These missing sections are included in the NRS 1918 volume.

External links
 
 

English shipwrights
1570 births
1647 deaths
16th-century Royal Navy personnel
17th-century Royal Navy personnel
Alumni of Emmanuel College, Cambridge
Harleian Collection
People from Deptford